Kameng Dolo is an Indian politician from Arunachal Pradesh.

Dolo was a deputy Chief Minister of Arunachal Pradesh in Kalikho Pul's government as well as Gegong Apang.

He founded Congress (Dolo) on July 25, 2003 and formed a government  along with Gegong Apang of Arunachal Congress. On August 30, 2003, he merged Congress (D) with Bharatiya Janata Party. He is also a member of the Bharatiya Janata Party. He shifted his loyalties in 2015 when the Indian National Congress member revolted in their government.

On 8 March 2017, Dolo lost his seat following an opposing candidate for his seat alleged that his candidacy was fraudulently withdrawn, making Dolo unopposed.

References

Living people
People from East Kameng district
Indian National Congress politicians
Bharatiya Janata Party politicians from Arunachal Pradesh
People's Party of Arunachal politicians
Arunachal Pradesh MLAs 2014–2019
Deputy Chief Ministers of Arunachal Pradesh
Year of birth missing (living people)
Arunachal Pradesh MLAs 1999–2004